Pectis papposa is a species of flowering plant in the family Asteraceae. It is native to North America, where it occurs in the southwestern United States as far east as Texas, and in northern Mexico. Common names include cinchweed, common chinchweed, many-bristle chinchweed, and many-bristle fetid-marigold.

This is a host plant of the beet leafhopper.

Uses
It can be found in Mexican markets sold as limoncillo. It is used in moderation to flavor meat.

Among indigenous peoples
The Pima use a decoction of the plant or the dried plant itself as a laxative. The Zuni people take an infusion of the whole plant as a carminative, and use an infusion of the flowers as eye drops for snowblindness. They also use the chewed flowers as perfume before dancing in ceremonies of "the secret fraternities". The Havasupai parch and grind the seeds and use them to make mush and soup. They also dip the fresh plant in salt water and eat it with mush or cornmeal as a condiment. The Pueblo use it as a spice.

References

papposa
Flora of North America
Plants used in traditional Native American medicine
Plants described in 1849
Plants used in Native American cuisine
Spices